Bernd Rücker (born 28 May 1965) is a German sport shooter who competed in the 1988 Summer Olympics, in the 1992 Summer Olympics, and in the 1996 Summer Olympics.

References

1965 births
Living people
German male sport shooters
ISSF rifle shooters
Olympic shooters of Germany
Olympic shooters of West Germany
Shooters at the 1988 Summer Olympics
Shooters at the 1992 Summer Olympics
Shooters at the 1996 Summer Olympics
World record holders in shooting
20th-century German people